The Women's Duet event at the 2010 South American Games had the Technical Routine on March 26 at 20:30, and the Free Routine on March 28 at 21:50.

Medalists

Results

Technical Routine

Free Routine

Summary

References
Technical Routine
Free Routine
Summary

Swimming at the 2010 South American Games